Mahmud Tukur was a Nigerian politician and former minister for Commerce and Industry during the administration of General Buhari. He was the first Vice Chancellor of Bayero University, Kano and also a former director of Cadbury Nigeria. Tukur's enviable position and competence displayed as the Vice Chancellor of Bayero University increased his public profile in Northern Nigeria. He became friends with contemporaries such as Mamman Daura, Adamu Ciroma, Hamza Rafindadi Zayyad to form a small clique of policy advocates in Northern Nigeria. He died on April 9, 2021 at the age of 82 years.

References
Shehu Othman, Classes, Crises and Coup: The Demise of Shagari's Regime, African Affairs > Vol. 83, No. 333 (Oct., 1984

Living people
Academic staff of Bayero University Kano
Year of birth missing (living people)